David Foley (born January 4, 1963) is a Canadian actor, stand-up comedian, director, producer and writer. He is known as a co-founder of the comedy group The Kids in the Hall, who have appeared together in a number of television, stage and film productions, most notably the 1988–1995 TV sketch comedy show of the same name, as well as the 1996 film Brain Candy. 

Foley is also known for playing Dave Nelson in the sitcom NewsRadio, for voicing the main character, Flik, in A Bug's Life, for voicing Terry in Monsters University, for portraying recurring character Bob Moore in the sitcom Hot in Cleveland, and hosting the game show Celebrity Poker Showdown.

Early life 
Foley was born in Etobicoke, Ontario, Canada, on January 4, 1963. He is the son of Mary and Michael, a steamfitter. His mother is from Stafford, England.

Career

Acting and stand-up comedy 

After dropping out of high school, Foley pursued standup comedy for about a year in the Toronto Second City Training Centre, where he began taking improv classes and met Kevin McDonald, who gave him a job as an usher at a local art house theatre. He played Lewis Allen in the miniseries Anne of Avonlea. Foley, McDonald, Bruce McCulloch, Mark McKinney and Scott Thompson formed The Kids in the Hall in 1984. The troupe's eponymous TV series debuted in 1988 and ended in 1995. Foley played characters including Hecubus, one of the Sizzler sisters, the A. T. & Love boss, Bruno Puntz Jones, Mr. Heavyfoot, Jocelyn and Lex. Initially involved with Kids in the Hall: Brain Candy, he left the troupe in the middle of the writing, dissatisfied with the internal strife and the quality of the script, and joined the NewsRadio cast instead. As he had not signed any contract with the studio, Foley agreed to sign a deal which would allow the rest of the troupe to get paid for the script, though he was convinced that it would never be shot. When it was greenlighted, Foley appeared in the film because he was contractually obligated to do so. He is the only member of the group who is uncredited as a writer. Foley rejoined the troupe in 2000 and has been an integral part of their various reformations. He appeared in the Kids in the Hall 2010 reunion project Death Comes to Town. Paul Simms, creator of NewsRadio, happened to be a huge fan of Foley's work and wrote the role of Dave Nelson specifically for him. Much of his character on the show was based on his own personality quirks, including his coffee addiction and his love of the sitcom Green Acres. In 1999 Dave portrayed Troy, the house mate of Eve in Blast From The Past.

Foley was recently reunited with NewsRadio writer Joe Furey when he recorded the special featurette Working with Joe Furey, an add-on to Furey's comedy Love and Support. Foley released his stand-up special, Relatively Well in January 2013, distributed by Showtime. In the comedy-thriller The Wrong Guy, Foley played Nelson Hibbert, an office worker who finds his boss murdered, mistakenly believes he will be blamed for the crime and runs off as a fugitive. In 2001, he played the boss of 'N Sync singer Lance Bass in the film On the Line. Foley hosted the CBC Christmas Special, The True Meaning of Christmas Specials, in which he, a Mexican Elvis impersonator, Elvis Stojko and Dick Dale travel to Canada in search of the true meaning of Christmas specials. He portrayed Jack McFarland's boyfriend Stuart Lamarack on Will & Grace in its 2003-2004 season. In 2004, Foley became host of Celebrity Poker Showdown on Bravo. In 2007, he appeared nude in Uwe Boll's film adaptation of the controversial PC game Postal and became the judge for the US version of Thank God You're Here. He portrayed a middle management employee who happens to be a vampire in the undead office comedy Netherbeast Incorporated (2007) and voiced the disgruntled elf Wayne in the holiday special series, Prep & Landing. He also guest-starred in the 2007 special, Bob & Doug McKenzie's Two-Four Anniversary. He played a high school principal in It's Always Sunny in Philadelphia. In 2011, he appeared in How I Met Your Mother as Marshall's possible future boss, Mr. Bloom. From 2011 to 2012, Foley played Jerry Dunham, the boss of Andrew Carlson (David Hornsby) in the short-lived CBS sitcom How to Be a Gentleman. In 2012 and 2013, Foley played Dr. Fulton, Brick's (Atticus Shaffer) school therapist in The Middle, where in "Life Skills", he refers to Brick's classmates as "the kids in the hall", after an awkward pause and glance by both characters and mentioning that their behavior is similar to those of comedy sketches from The Kids in the Hall. In February 2013, Foley played Detective Bob Moore for the three last seasons in the TV Land sitcom, Hot in Cleveland (with an unrelated guest appearance as a charity doctor in the first season), starred in the third season of Robson Arms on CTV and also starred in the CTV sitcom Spun Out in 2014. Foley also starred in ABC's Dr. Ken.

Foley has also voiced various characters in animated films, television series and video games, such as Flik in A Bug's Life (as well as reprising for a cameo of the character during the outtakes of Toy Story 2 and the epilogue of Cars as well as in a segment from Robot Chicken, and Lego The Incredibles), Yes Man in Fallout: New Vegas, Terry in Monsters University, Agent Rick in Pound Puppies, Chris in Dan Vs. and Wayne in the Prep & Landing series.

Web series 
In 2009, Foley was hired by 49 North Inc./Fuel Industries, a multi-national branded content and entertainment company, to star in a web series titled, The Sensible Traveler with Bobby Fargo with six episodes that are written by TV writer Stephen Hibbert and directed by a number of people, including Leslie Iwerks and Chris Roach. To date, the series is one of 49 North Inc./Fuel Industries' most successful web series at well over 20,000 hits since the beginning of 2010. No word has yet been released as to a second season being filmed.

Music video appearances 
In 1993, Foley appeared along with Mark McKinney and Kevin McDonald in the music video for the song "Heterosexual Man" by Vancouver band Odds. In the video, the three comedians played stereotypical macho jocks in the audience of a small bar where Odds are playing until Foley inexplicably turns into a woman.

He starred in the music video for the 2005 song "Yellow Datsun" by Neva Dinova.
In 2008, he appeared in the alternate music video for the song "Americanarama" by Ottawa band Hollerado, where he parodied American Apparel CEO Dov Charney. He also appeared in the music video for the band's song "Desire 126". In 2010, Foley appeared in a music video for the Los Angeles band Black Robot's cover of the JJ Cale song "Cocaine", which was filmed at the burlesque club Jumbo's Clown Room. In 2012, Foley starred in Off!'s music video for their song Borrow and Bomb, playing a "professional educator" named Dale Antwerp who hosts a public access talk show entitled Teen Talk. He appeared in another Off! video in 2014 for their song "Red White and Black", playing the role of a fascist organizer.

Personal life 
Foley married Canadian writer Tabatha Southey on December 31, 1991. They divorced in 1997. The couple has two children. In 2001, an interim child support agreement obligated Foley to pay Southey $10,700 a month, a figure based on his income when NewsRadio was in production. By 2011, Foley claimed that his earnings had declined to the point that the $10,700 sum constituted "literally 400 per cent of [his] income," but he was unable to get the obligation reduced in court. Owing over half a million dollars in back payments, he believed that if he returned to Canada he would be arrested under orders from Ontario's Family Responsibility Office. By 2013, Foley and Southey had settled a child support lawsuit, and he was able to resume work in the country of his birth. After he took the lead role in Spun Out, he told Vancouver's The Georgia Straight that "I made enough money to pay the price of admission to Canada."

Foley married his second wife, actress Crissy Guerrero, on August 1, 2002. The marriage ended in a divorce in 2008. They have a daughter, Alina Chiara Foley, born April 16, 2003, who worked as a child actor. Guerrero and Foley subsequently reconciled and were remarried on December 31, 2016.

Throughout his entire life, Foley has suffered from depression. He "used to drink quite a bit", but stopped drinking on December 22, 2014, after he fell backwards while intoxicated, resulting in a severe head injury. Foley received a subdural hematoma and spent four days in the intensive care unit. In February 2019, he remarked that he hadn't "had a drink in four years" and had experienced almost no depression following his injury.

Foley resides in downtown Los Angeles. He is a fan of coffee, claiming to drink up to "50 cups a day when I am on set".

Filmography

Film

Television

Video games

Theme parks

Web

References

External links 

 

1963 births
20th-century Canadian male actors
21st-century Canadian male actors
Canadian atheists
Canadian male film actors
Canadian male television actors
Canadian male voice actors
Canadian stand-up comedians
Canadian people of English descent
Canadian expatriate male actors in the United States
Canadian television personalities
Comedians from Toronto
The Kids in the Hall members
People from Etobicoke
Poker commentators
Living people
Male actors from Toronto
Canadian sketch comedians
Canadian male comedians
20th-century Canadian comedians
21st-century Canadian comedians
Canadian Comedy Award winners